Major League Cricket (MLC) is an upcoming professional Twenty20 cricket league in the United States. Operated by American Cricket Enterprises (ACE) and sanctioned by USA Cricket, it plans to begin play on July 13, 2023, with six teams in major U.S. cities under a single-entity model. The first season is set to take place over three weeks at Grand Prairie Stadium in Grand Prairie, Texas, near Dallas, concluding on July 30, 2023. In 2021, the development league for MLC, Minor League Cricket (MiLC), completed its inaugural season, which was contested by 27 franchise-based teams.

History 
There have been various attempts to hold a Twenty20 (T20) cricket league in the United States, such as the short-lived Pro Cricket (which played a single season in 2004), and the American Premier League, a proposed league in partnership between the United States of America Cricket Association (USACA) and New Zealand Cricket, modeled after domestic T20 competitions.

In January 2019, USA Cricket was approved as the new governing board for cricket in USA, replacing the USACA, which had been expelled from the International Cricket Council in September 2017 due to governance issues.

The new body set a goal for cricket to reach wider, mainstream popularity in the country, where it has typically been considered a niche international sport.

In November 2018, USA Cricket announced that it was seeking partners to establish a domestic T20 league in the country by 2021, with goals to "engage existing fans and grow new ones", and spur "sustainable development of cricketing infrastructure across the United States". In May 2019, USA Cricket accepted a bid by American Cricket Enterprises (ACE) for a $1 billion investment, covering the league and other investments benefitting the U.S. national teams. Its partners include Satyan Gajwani and Vineet Jain of The Times Group, and Willow TV founders Sameer Mehta and Vijay Srinivasan. As part of the agreement, ACE also handles commercial activities for T20I and ODI matches hosted by the United States.

In an annual general meeting on February 21, 2020, it was stated that USA Cricket planned to launch Major League Cricket in 2021, and a 22-team development league known as Minor League Cricket that summer as a prelude. Minor League Cricket was officially announced the following week, with plans to host a nine-week, 170-game season beginning July 4. However, it was postponed to  2021 due to the COVID-19 pandemic in the United States.

In October 2020, USA Cricket reaffirmed plans to launch Major League Cricket in 2022 as part of its "foundational plan" for 2020–23. On December 1, 2020, it was announced that the IPL's Kolkata Knight Riders (co-owned by Bollywood actor Shah Rukh Khan) would invest in ACE. In February 2021, MLC announced plans for Minor League Cricket Youth and Major League Cricket Youth leagues, which would, alongside a MLC Jr. Championship and player development program, serve as a development system for younger players to progress towards Major League Cricket and the national team. In May 2021, the launch of Major League Cricket was delayed to 2023 due to COVID-19 and to provide additional time to develop facilities.

In February 2023, it was announced that the player draft for the league's inaugural season would be held on March 19, 2023.

In June 2022, MLC announced the inaugural season of Minor League Cricket Youth (MiLC Youth). The inaugural season of MiLC Youth was announced to be contested between 11 teams at the Prairie View Cricket Complex in Houston starting July 25, 2022. The finals for the inaugural season took place on July 29 at between the Dallas Mustangs and the New Jersey Stallions, in which the Stallions beat the Mustangs by 2 wickets.

In May 2022, Major League Cricket announced it had acquired funds of $120 million as part of its Series A and A1 fundraising rounds. Investors committing to MLC featured the likes of Microsoft CEO Satya Nadella, Ross Perot Jr., Anand Rajaraman, Shantanu Narayen and more. MLC plans to use these funds to mainly build stadiums and first-class facilities in the hopes of accelerating cricket's development across the United States.

The first ever player draft was held on 19 March 2023 at the NASA Johnson Space Center in Houston. Draft was conducted in 9 rounds, with one of the round being for the rookie player selection. Each of the six teams had a purse of USD 800,000 for the overseas players and USD 300,000 for the US-based players. The overseas signings were directly signed and were not part of the draft. Each franchise must have a minimum of 15 players, and the maximum squad size being 18 the maximum number of overseas players allowed is 9.

In November 2022, it was announced the first season of MLC will be staged from July 13–30, 2023 at Grand Prairie Stadium. The tournament will be played in a single round-robin format with 15 league matches played among six franchises before a four-match play-off phase. MLC also hopes to play matches in a to-be-constructed stadium in Los Angeles, and Church Street Park.

Teams 
MLC is expected to begin with six teams; the league will use a single-entity structure under which all teams are owned by ACE, with investor-operators (who have invested in the company) assigned to each team. It hopes to expand to eight teams in the future, similar to other T20 leagues around the world.

USA Cricket's CEO Iain Higgins identified Atlanta, Chicago, Los Angeles, New Jersey, New York, and San Francisco as markets where the sport was most popular. The league's six inaugural teams will be in Dallas, Los Angeles, New York, San Francisco, Seattle, and Washington, D.C..

The San Francisco Unicorns have already signed former Australian captain Aaron Finch to be the captain alongside fellow Australian Marcus Stoinis. Mitchell Marsh has been signed by Seattle Orcas, while Matthew Wade is set to join the Texas Super Kings.

List of current teams

Venues 
On November 18, 2020, it was announced that ACE would lease AirHogs Stadium in Grand Prairie, Texas—home of the former Texas AirHogs independent baseball team—and convert it to a cricket-specific facility that will host a Dallas-based team in Major League Cricket.

In March 2022, ACE discussed plans to invest $110 million in eight newly constructed or renovated venues for the league and possible hosting of matches during the 2024 ICC Men's T20 World Cup (which the United States is co-hosting with the West Indies), including the aforementioned Grand Prairie Stadium, Church Street Park in Morrisville, Moosa Stadium in Pearland, Prairie View Cricket Complex in Prairie View, and new sites in Orange County (backed by the Knight Riders), the Santa Clara County Fairgrounds, and Marymoor Park in Redmond, Washington. The renovated venues have a budget of approximately $3 million each, while the three new west coast venues have a budget of $30 million each; ACE stated that the west coast venues would be completed by 2024, and will have a projected capacity of 10,000–20,000. As of November 2022, it was reported that work on the other proposed pitches had not yet commenced.

In February 2023, it was announced that a majority of the inaugural season games is set to be played in the Grand Prairie Stadium located near Dallas, Texas, with Church Street Park located in Morrisville, North Carolina, set to be used as a secondary venue. Due to the summer heat in Texas, it was reported by ESPN that most matches would be scheduled as night games, rather than scheduled in the daytime hours to attract audiences in markets such as India.

Minor League Cricket 

Minor League Cricket is a developmental league for Major League Cricket that completed its inaugural season in 2021 (delayed from 2020 due to COVID-19). It consists of 26 (previously 27) franchise-based teams in four regional divisions. Unlike Major League Cricket, Minor League Cricket uses privately owned franchises.

Notes

References

External links
 

United States cricket in the 21st century
Cricket administration in the United States
Professional cricket leagues
Cricket leagues in the United States
Professional sports leagues in the United States
Twenty20 cricket leagues
Sports leagues established in 2019
2019 establishments in the United States
Proposed sports leagues